The 1897 Arkansas Industrial Cardinals football team represented the University of Arkansas during the 1897 college football season. Arkansas opened its 1897 season with its sixth game in four years against the team from Fort Smith High School. The Cardinals next competed in their third intercollegiate game, playing  to a 6–6 tie. On November 20, 1897, Arkansas won its first ever intercollegiate football game against Ouachita College, a liberal arts college in Arkadelphia, Arkansas.

The captains of the 1897 team were H. Y. Fishback and E. G. Martin.  John C. Futrall was the manager, and B. N. Wilson was the coach. Coach Wilson received a bachelor of science degree from Georgia School of Technology (Georgia Tech) in 1896 and joined the faculty at Arkansas Industrial as an instructor of mechanical engineering.  He served as the football team's trainer in the fall of 1896 and took over as the coach in 1897.

Schedule

References

Arkansas
Arkansas Razorbacks football seasons
Arkansas Industrial Cardinals football